Éder Aleixo de Assis, also known as Éder or Éder Aleixo (born 25 May 1957), is a Brazilian former footballer. 

He played as a left winger, and as a forward, most notably with Atlético Mineiro in the Campeonato Brasileiro and with the Brazil national team. He also played for Palmeiras and Grêmio, among other teams. A few years later, he transferred to Turkey, where he played for Malatyaspor during 1988–89 season, along with Carlos and Serginho.

International career
Éder Aleixo gained 52 caps with the Brazil national team between May 1979 and April 1986, and  came to international prominence during the 1982 FIFA World Cup while playing alongside Zico, Sócrates and Falcão in what's  considered one of the greatest  international football teams ever. In Brazil's first match of the tournament Eder scored a wonderful winning goal against the Soviet Union, flicking the ball up and volleying it into the net with blistering power and precision from 25 yards out. He followed that up with another outstanding goal in the 4–1 win over Scotland when, after feigning to shoot, he lofted the ball over Scotland's frozen goalie Alan Rough and into the far corner from the edge of the area. He smashed a bending free kick against the crossbar vs Argentina in the 2nd round group game from 30 yards out, and this shot resulted in the first goal of the match scored by Zico.

Éder Aleixo didn't make the Brazilian squad for the 1986 World Cup, after losing form and fitness during the preceding season, and also because he apparently pushed a ball boy during a warm-up game for Brazil. He was sent off in his final international match, against Peru, in April 1986. Off the field he was occasionally a controversial figure; rumours abounded that he preferred partying to training and often fell out with coaches and team mates.

Style of play
A predominantly left-footed player, Éder Aleixo usually played as a wide midfielder on the left flank, although he was also capable of playing as a forward or in a free role as a second striker; in his prime, he was considered to be one of the best players in the world in his position. Although he wasn't the quickest winger, he was highly creative, athletically built, and had dazzling technical skills and close control, as well as an extremely accurate and powerful bending shot with his left foot (one of his strikes reportedly reached a speed of 174.5 km/h) that earned him the nickname O Canhão ("The Cannon") from his fans; he was capable of bending the ball in any direction by striking it with either the inside or the outside of the instep of his left foot, while he was not particularly adept with his weaker right foot. In addition to his ball striking abilities from outside the area or from volleys in open play, he was also known for his accuracy from free kicks, as well as his excellent ball delivery from set-pieces and corners, and his accurate long passing and crossing ability. Despite his ability as a footballer, he was also notorious for his poor work-rate, difficult and temperamental character, and lack of discipline both on and off the pitch, which led him to have difficulties with several of his managers.

Honours

Club
Grêmio Foot-Ball Porto Alegrense
 Reconquista: 1977
 Campeonato Gaúcho: 1979
 Hexa: 1978, 1979
 Torneo Ciudad de Rosario: 1979

Clube Atlético Mineiro
 Campeonato Mineiro: 1980, 1981, 1982, 1983, 1985, 1995
 Tournoi de Paris: 1982
 Trofeo Ramón de Carranza: 1990

Cruzeiro Esporte Clube
 Copa do Brasil: 1993

Individual
 Brazilian Silver Ball: 1983
 South American Player of the Year Bronze award: 1983

References

1957 births
Living people
Brazilian footballers
Association football forwards
América Futebol Clube (MG) players
Clube Atlético Mineiro players
Grêmio Foot-Ball Porto Alegrense players
Botafogo de Futebol e Regatas players
Santos FC players
Sport Club do Recife players
Club Athletico Paranaense players
Associação Atlética Internacional (Limeira) players
Malatyaspor footballers
Cruzeiro Esporte Clube players
Sociedade Esportiva do Gama players
União São João Esporte Clube players
Cerro Porteño players
Campeonato Brasileiro Série A players
Süper Lig players
1982 FIFA World Cup players
1983 Copa América players
Brazil international footballers
Brazilian expatriate footballers
Brazilian expatriate sportspeople in Paraguay
Brazilian expatriate sportspeople in Turkey
Expatriate footballers in Paraguay
Expatriate footballers in Turkey